Delmal, also spelled Denmal/Dilmal, is a village in Chanasma Taluka of Patan district in Gujarat state of India. It is a Dawoodi Bohra pilgrimage site. The village is the site of the tomb of Syedi Hasanfeer who lived there in the 14th century.

Places of interest 
The Limbaja Mata temple is monument of national importance (N-GJ-171).

Gallery

References

Villages in Patan district